Chandra Malla was the forty-sixth king of the Mallabhum. He ruled from 1460 to 1501 CE.

History
Chandra Malla establishment of Gokulnagar village and the idol of Gokul Chand and Shri at the place 12 miles away from Bishnupur at its eastern side. During his regime Radha Krishna puja started and Chaitanya Dev took birth in Bengal.

References

Sources
 

Malla rulers
Kings of Mallabhum
15th-century Indian monarchs
Mallabhum